Carolyna Hutchings (born 26 June 1975), known previously as Caroline Danjuma and Caroline Ekanem, is a Nigerian actress. She made her screen debut in 2004, starring in some of Chico Ejiro's popular films. After a hiatus from the film industry, she made a comeback in 2016, producing and starring in the romantic thriller Stalker.

Early life and education
Caroline was born  to a Scottish father and a Nigerian mother. She is the first of three children. She studied environmental protection management, geography and regional planning at the University of Calabar. She also obtained a certificate of achievement in organizational behavior from Edinburgh Business School in 2016.

Acting career
Chico Ejiro, through Rita Dominic, introduced Hutchings to the Nigerian film industry in the 2004 film Deadly Care. She starred in other successful films, including Deadly Kiss (2004), Missing Angel (2004), The Captor (2006), Foreign Affairs, Real Love, The Twist, A Second Time and The Beast and the Angel. Her latest film is Stalker, co-starring Jim Iyke and Nse Ikpe Etim. In August 2017, she was honored for her advocacy programs centered around building capacities for Nigerian youths by a Pan-African organization.

Personal life
Hutchings married Musa Danjuma, the younger brother of Theophilus Danjuma, in 2007. The couple has two sons and a daughter. They divorced in 2016.

Although many local publications have cited Hutchings' birth year to be 1980 or 1981, she has repeatedly stated that she was born on 26 June 1987, provided her master's degree identification card as proof in 2015, and denied that she has never falsified her age.

See also
 List of Nigerian film producers

References

External links
 

University of Calabar alumni
1975 births
21st-century Nigerian actresses
Nigerian film producers
Living people
Nigerian people of Scottish descent
Nigerian film actresses
Caroline
Age controversies
University of Lagos alumni
Participants in Nigerian reality television series